Vixen Inlet is located within the U.S. state of Alaska. The inlet has a small islet—Sunshine Island—in the middle of its entrance, and a stream at its head. A reef is southward from the south side of Vixen Point. There is deep water between it and the shore southward. A rock on each side near the entrance, and a rock inside of Sunshine Island, are recorded.

References

Bibliography

Inlets of Alaska
Bodies of water of Wrangell, Alaska